Mary Vincent may refer to:

 Mary Ann Vincent (1818–1887), British-born American actress
 Mary Sauer (Mary Sauer-Vincent, born 1975), American pole vaulter
 Mary Vincent (artist) (born 1963), survivor of rape and dismemberment who went on to become an artist and create her own prosthetics for daily tasks